Steve England is a British radio producer and disc-jockey known for his involvement in pirate radio and pioneering production work in radio jingles.

Biography
England was a disc-jockey on the offshore pirate radio stations Radio Caroline, Radio Mi Amigo, and Radio Atlantis where he also became programme director. England then went on to broadcast for one of the first independent local radio stations in the UK, Piccadilly Radio in Manchester.

After spending time as head of commercial production, England started a partnership with Alan Fawkes and set up Alfasound in 1979.  England and Alfasound were one of the earliest proponents of jingle packages in the United Kingdom.  The company produced many jingle packages for UK and European radio stations from its base in Sale, Greater Manchester; one such package was for the Italian radio station, Radio Nova International.  

Alan Fawkes and Steve England parted company in 1997 after serious disagreements and England set up his own production company. In 2001, he merged his company with S2Blue. He acts as the UK and Ireland agent for Jam Creative Productions and PAMS productions of Dallas, Texas, meaning that stations can have many classic radio jingles re-sung with their name.

England also presented on and helped to set up Moorlands Radio, the community radio station for the Staffordshire Moorlands based in Leek, Staffordshire.

England retired from the business in 2011, but occasionally still performs voice-overs.  As of 2023, England presents weekend shows on Atlantis Radio featuring vintage jingles and 60s songs.

References

External links
Steve England Official Site.
 

Living people
British radio personalities
British radio DJs
British radio presenters
English radio DJs
English radio presenters
Offshore radio broadcasters
Pirate radio personalities
Year of birth missing (living people)